Sir Edward Grogan, 1st Baronet (5 November 1802 – 26 January 1891) was an Irish Conservative Party politician.

He was the eldest son of John Grogan, barrister, of Raheny, Dublin, and Sarah Medlicott. The Grogan family of Dublin were cousins of the Grogans of Johnstown  Castle, County Wexford, who narrowly escaped forfeiture of their estates after the Irish Rebellion of 1798, in which they fought on the rebel side. Educated at Winchester College and Trinity College Dublin, Grogan matriculated with a M.A. degree. He was called to the bar in 1840. He was made a baronet on 23 April 1859, of Moyvore, County Westmeath.

He was elected as Member of Parliament (MP) for Dublin City at the 1841 general election, and held the seat until the 1865 general election. As a young man, he was a fierce opponent of  Catholic Emancipation, but this had ceased to be a live issue long before he entered politics.

In 1867, he married Catherine Charlotte MacMahon, daughter of Sir Beresford Burston MacMahon, 2nd Baronet and Maria Bateson, and granddaughter of Sir William MacMahon, 1st Baronet, Master of the Rolls in Ireland. They had four children. In January 1891, he fell from the upstairs window of his home in Dundrum and suffered severe injuries, dying two weeks later.

He was succeeded in the title by his son Edward (1873–1927).

Arms

References

External links 

1802 births
1891 deaths
Irish Conservative Party MPs
Members of the Parliament of the United Kingdom for County Dublin constituencies (1801–1922)
UK MPs 1841–1847
UK MPs 1847–1852
UK MPs 1852–1857
UK MPs 1857–1859
UK MPs 1859–1865
Baronets in the Baronetage of the United Kingdom
People educated at Winchester College
Alumni of Trinity College Dublin